Julio Iglesias World Tour was a concert tour by Julio Iglesias to promote his first English album 1100 Bel Air Place. The tour consisted of 124 shows with a length of 7 months and ran through 33 US and Canadian cities, Europe, South Africa, Australia and the Orient. The tour sold around 1 million tickets. Iglesias signed a three-year deal with Coca-Cola and was the tour sponsor, three months after Pepsi's deal with Michael Jackson.

History

The tour take him to 33 US and Canadian cities, Europe, South Africa, Australia and the Orient.

Opening acts 
 Michael Davis (US & Canada)

Tour dates

Box office score data

Cancelled shows

References

1984 concert tours
1985 concert tours